Chloroleucon is a genus of flowering plants in the family Fabaceae. Some authorities consider it part of the genus Albizia. Its name is derived from the Greek words χλωρóς (chloros), meaning "green," and λευκός (leukos), meaning "white."

Selected species
 Chloroleucon chacoense (Burk.) Barneby & J.W.Grimes – Palo Barroso (Argentina, Paraguay, Bolivia)
 Chloroleucon dumosum (Benth.) G.P.Lewis
 Chloroleucon foliolosum (Benth.) G.P.Lewis
 Chloroleucon eurycyclum Barneby & J.W.Grimes (Venezuela)
 Chloroleucon extortum Barneby & J.W.Grimes (Brazil)
 Chloroleucon mangense (Jacq.) Britton & Rose
 Chloroleucon tenuiflorum (Benth.) Barneby & J.W.Grimes
 Chloroleucon tortum (Mart.) Pittier (Brazil)

Formerly placed here
Ebenopsis ebano (Berland.) Barneby & J.W.Grimes (as C. ebano (Berland.) L.Rico)

References

External links

 
Fabaceae genera
Taxonomy articles created by Polbot